Ana Maria Savu (née Dragut; born 24 February 1990) is a Romanian handballer for SCM Gloria Buzău (women's handball) and the Romanian national team.

Individual awards
 Prosport Best Right Back of the Romanian Liga Națională: 2018

References

External links

 

1990 births
Living people
People from Darabani
Romanian female handball players
Expatriate handball players
Romanian expatriate sportspeople in Hungary
SCM Râmnicu Vâlcea (handball) players